Shamsul Haque may refer to:

 Shamsul Haque (general), Bangladesh Army general
 Shamsul Haque (Chandpur politician), Jatiya Party (Ershad) politician and former Member of Parliament of Chandpur-2
 Shamsul Haque (Mymensingh politician), Bangladesh Awami League politician and former Member of Parliament of Mymensingh-10
Md. Shamsul Haque, Bangladesh Awami League politician and former Member of Parliament of Mymensingh-2